Guy Williams (born 11 July 1971) is a British showjumper, ranked number four in Great Britain as of July 2011, part of the GBR equestrian team, and winner of a number of prestigious titles including the British Jumping Derby in 2010.

Guy was also part of the bronze medal-winning team in Madrid in 2011.

References

External links

Official website
Team Williams website

British male equestrians
British show jumping riders
1971 births
Living people